Burara amara, the small green awlet, is a species of hesperid butterfly found in Northeast India and Southeast Asia. The butterfly has been reassigned to the genus Burara by Vane-Wright and de Jong (2003) and is now Burara amara.

Range
The small green awlet ranges from India, (Sikkim eastwards through Assam), to Myanmar, Thailand, Laos, Hainan and south Yunnan. It is also found in the Andaman islands.

The type locality is northeast Bengal.

Status
It is rare in the Himalayas and very rare in the Andamans.

Description

The butterfly has a wingspan of 45 to 55 mm.

Edward Yerbury Watson (1891) gives a detailed description:

Habits
It is crepuscular.

Cited references

See also
Hesperiidae
Coeliadinae
List of butterflies of India (Coeliadinae)
List of butterflies of India (Hesperiidae)

References

Print

Watson, E. Y. (1891) Hesperiidae indicae. Vest and Co. Madras.

Online

Brower, Andrew V. Z. and Warren, Andrew, (2007). Coeliadinae Evans 1937. Version 21 February 2007 (temporary). http://tolweb.org/Coeliadinae/12150/2007.02.21 in The Tree of Life Web Project, http://tolweb.org/

Bibasis
Butterflies described in 1865
Butterflies of Asia
Taxa named by Frederic Moore